Carina, Princess of Sayn-Wittgenstein-Berleburg (born Carina Axelsson; August 5, 1968) is an American author and former model, best known for the teen fashion detective series Model Undercover. Her other series are the Nigel of Hyde Park books and the Royal Rebel books. As a model, she appeared on the covers of Madame Figaro, Elle, and Vogue Patterns in the 1990s. She is the wife of Gustav, 7th Prince of Sayn-Wittgenstein-Berleburg.

Biography and career

Personal life
Carina Axelsson was born on August 5, 1968 in Northern California, United States, to Bertil and Alicia Axelsson. She has a brother Erik and sister Liselotte. Her father was an electronic engineer and was born in Sweden, and her mother is Mexican. After growing up in California, Axelsson moved to New York to pursue a career in fashion modelling. 

On June 3, 2022 she married civilly the German-Danish aristocrat Gustav, 7th Prince of Sayn-Wittgenstein-Berleburg, thus becoming the Princess of Sayn-Wittgenstein-Berleburg, after dating for 19 years. They married religiously the following day in Bad Berleburg. They live at Schloss Berleburg in Germany with their four dogs. They were unable to marry earlier due to a clause in Gustav's grandfather's will preventing him from inheriting family property if he partakes in an unequal marriage (meaning with a commoner). Nonetheless, she was treated by the Sayn-Wittgenstein-Berleburg House as his official partner and accompanied him to family events.

Axelsson is good friends with Prince Joachim of Denmark, the son of Margrethe II of Denmark, and Joachim's second wife Princess Marie of Denmark. Axelsson is godmother to their daughter Princess Athena. Axelsson married into the Danish royal family, as her husband is Danish Princess Benedikte's first child.

Career
Axelsson modeled for a number of notable magazines. She appeared in the August and September 1991 editions of the American version of Vogue, shot by photographers Robert Diadul in August and Angel Morale in September. In the December 1992 edition of Vogue Italia, she had a 10-page spread styled as Bianca Jagger, shot by German photographer Ellen von Unwerth. She appeared in Vogue Italia in later editions as well, including February 1993, again shot by von Unwerth, and in 1995. She appeared on the July 1993 cover of French magazine Madame Figaro, the September 1993 cover of the German edition of Elle magazine, followed by the January/February 1994 edition of Vogue Patterns magazine.

From New York, Axelsson moved to Paris, where she studied art and wrote and illustrated her first book, a picture book for children (Nigel of Hyde Park, 2004, Assouline). Axelsson continued in fashion with a short stint working as PA to fashion designer John Galliano. Her experiences in fashion - along with a love of Scooby-Doo and Agatha Christie - inspired her to write the Model Undercover book series. Axelsson announced the series in a 2014 article for The Children's Book Review, and the book was released that year. Clare O'Beara of Fresh Fiction stated "her mystery series is a winner as far as I'm concerned."

Published works

Nigel of Hyde Park series

Model Undercover series

Royal Rebel series

Filmography

References

External links 
 Official website
 Carina Axelsson at IMDb

1968 births
Living people
People from Santa Cruz, California
American people of Swedish descent
American writers of Mexican descent
American expatriates in Germany
Female models from California
21st-century American novelists
American women novelists
21st-century American women writers
Novelists from California
House of Sayn-Wittgenstein
German princesses